Unit quaternions, known as versors, provide a convenient mathematical notation for representing spatial orientations and rotations of elements in three dimensional space. Specifically, they encode information about an axis-angle rotation about an arbitrary axis. Rotation and orientation quaternions have applications in computer graphics, computer vision, robotics, navigation, molecular dynamics, flight dynamics, orbital mechanics of satellites, and crystallographic texture analysis.

When used to represent rotation, unit quaternions are also called rotation quaternions as they represent the 3D rotation group. When used to represent an orientation (rotation relative to a reference coordinate system), they are called orientation quaternions or attitude quaternions.

Compared to rotation matrices, quaternions are more compact, efficient, and numerically stable. Compared to Euler angles, they are simpler to compose.

Using quaternions as rotations 

In 3-dimensional space, according to Euler's rotation theorem, any rotation or sequence of rotations of a rigid body or coordinate system about a fixed point is equivalent to a single rotation by a given angle  about a fixed axis (called the Euler axis) that runs through the fixed point. The Euler axis is typically represented by a unit vector  ( in the picture). Therefore, any rotation in three dimensions can be represented as a combination of a vector   and a scalar .

Quaternions give a simple way to encode this axis–angle representation in four numbers, and can be used to apply (calculate) the corresponding rotation to a position vector , representing a point relative to the origin in R3.

Therefore, a rotation of angle  around the axis defined by the unit vector
 
can be represented by a quaternion. This can be done using an extension of Euler's formula:

 

It can be shown  that the desired rotation can be applied to an ordinary vector  in 3-dimensional space, considered as a quaternion with a real coordinate equal to zero, by evaluating the conjugation of  by :
 
using the Hamilton product, where  is the new position vector of the point after the rotation. The vector part of the resulting quaternion is the desired vector .

A geometric fact independent of quaternions is the existence of a two-to-one mapping from physical rotations to rotational transformation matrices. (See 2:1 mapping of SU(2) to SO(3)) If both rotations are a half-turn , both  and  will have a real coordinate equal to zero.

Mathematically, this operation carries the set of all "pure" quaternions  (those with real part equal to zero)—which constitute a 3-dimensional space among the quaternions—into itself, by the desired rotation about the axis u, by the angle θ. (Each real quaternion is carried into itself by this operation. But for the purpose of rotations in 3-dimensional space, we ignore the real quaternions.)

In this instance,  is a unit quaternion and
 

,
which is the same as rotating (conjugating) by  and then by . The scalar component of the result is necessarily zero.

The quaternion inverse of a rotation is the opposite rotation, since . The square of a quaternion rotation is a rotation by twice the angle around the same axis. This can be extended to arbitrary real , allowing for smooth interpolation between spatial orientations; see Slerp.

Two rotation quaternions can be combined into one equivalent quaternion by the relation:

 

in which  corresponds to the rotation  followed by the rotation . Thus, an arbitrary number of rotations can be composed together and then applied as a single rotation. (Note that quaternion multiplication is not commutative.)

Example conjugation operation 

Conjugating  by  refers to the operation .

Consider the rotation  around the axis , with a rotation angle of 120°, or  radians. 

We are therefore dealing with a conjugation by the unit quaternion

If  is the rotation function,

It can be proven that the inverse of a unit quaternion is obtained simply by changing the sign of its imaginary components. As a consequence,

and

This can be simplified, using the ordinary rules for quaternion arithmetic, to

As expected, the rotation corresponds to keeping a cube held fixed at one point, and rotating it 120° about the long diagonal through the fixed point (observe how the three axes are permuted cyclically).

Quaternion-derived rotation matrix 
A quaternion rotation  (with ) can be algebraically manipulated into a matrix rotation , where  is the rotation matrix given by:

 

Here  and if  is a unit quaternion, .

By using the formula for multiplication of two quaternions that are expressed as scalar and vector parts,

this equation can be rewritten as

Recovering the axis-angle representation 

The expression  rotates any vector quaternion  around an axis given by the vector  by the angle , where  and  depends on the quaternion .

 and  can be found from the following equations:

where  is the two-argument arctangent.

Care should be taken when the quaternion approaches a scalar, since due to degeneracy the axis of an identity rotation is not well-defined.

The composition of spatial rotations
A benefit of the quaternion formulation of the composition of two rotations RB and RA is that it yields directly the rotation axis and angle of the composite rotation RC = RBRA.

Let the quaternion associated with a spatial rotation R be constructed from its rotation axis S with the rotation angle  around this axis.  The associated quaternion is given by

Then the composition of the rotation RB with RA is the rotation RC = RBRA with rotation axis and angle defined by the product of the quaternions

that is

Expand this product to obtain

Divide both sides of this equation by the identity, which is the law of cosines on a sphere,

and compute

This is Rodrigues' formula for the axis of a composite rotation defined in terms of the axes of the two rotations.  He derived this formula in 1840 (see page 408).

The three rotation axes A, B, and C form a spherical triangle and the dihedral angles between the planes formed by the sides of this triangle are defined by the rotation angles.   Hamilton presented the component form of these equations showing that the quaternion product computes the third vertex of a spherical triangle from two given vertices and their associated arc-lengths, which is also defines an algebra for points in Elliptic geometry.

Axis–angle composition

Or with angle addition trigonometric substitutions...

Differentiation with respect to the rotation quaternion 

The rotated quaternion  needs to be differentiated with respect to the rotating quaternion , when the rotation is estimated from numerical optimization. The estimation of rotation angle is an essential procedure in 3D object registration or camera calibration. For unitary  and pure imaginary , that is for a rotation in 3D space, the derivatives of the rotated quaternion can be represented using matrix calculus notation as

A derivation can be found in.

Background

Quaternions

The complex numbers can be defined by introducing an abstract symbol  which satisfies the usual rules of algebra and additionally the rule . This is sufficient to reproduce all of the rules of complex number arithmetic: for example:
 

From this all of the rules of quaternion arithmetic follow, such as the rules on multiplication of quaternion basis elements. Using these rules, one can show that:
 

When quaternions are used in geometry, it is more convenient to define them as a scalar plus a vector:

 

Some might find it strange to add a number to a vector, as they are objects of very different natures, or to multiply two vectors together, as this operation is usually undefined. However, if one remembers that it is a mere notation for the real and imaginary parts of a quaternion, it becomes more legitimate. In other words, the correct reasoning is the addition of two quaternions, one with zero vector/imaginary part, and another one with zero scalar/real part:

We can express quaternion multiplication in the modern language of vector cross and dot products (which were actually inspired by the quaternions in the first place). When multiplying the vector/imaginary parts, in place of the rules  we have the quaternion multiplication rule:
 
where:
  is the resulting quaternion,
  is vector cross product (a vector),
  is vector scalar product (a scalar).

Quaternion multiplication is noncommutative (because of the cross product, which anti-commutes), while scalar–scalar and scalar–vector multiplications commute. From these rules it follows immediately that (see details):

The (left and right) multiplicative inverse or reciprocal of a nonzero quaternion is given by the conjugate-to-norm ratio (see details):

as can be verified by direct calculation (note the similarity to the multiplicative inverse of complex numbers).

Rotation identity

Let  be a unit vector (the rotation axis) and let . Our goal is to show that

yields the vector  rotated by an angle  around the axis . Expanding out (and bearing in mind that ), we have

Using trigonometric identities:

This is the formula of a rotation by  around the  axis.

Quaternion rotation operations 

A very formal explanation of the properties used in this section is given by Altman.

The hypersphere of rotations

Visualizing the space of rotations
Unit quaternions represent the group of Euclidean rotations in three dimensions in a very straightforward way. The correspondence between rotations and quaternions can be understood by first visualizing the space of rotations itself.

In order to visualize the space of rotations, it helps to consider a simpler case. Any rotation in three dimensions can be described by a rotation by some angle about some axis; for our purposes, we will use an axis vector to establish handedness for our angle. Consider the special case in which the axis of rotation lies in the xy plane. We can then specify the axis of one of these rotations by a point on a circle through which the vector crosses, and we can select the radius of the circle to denote the angle of rotation.

Similarly, a rotation whose axis of rotation lies in the xy plane can be described as a point on a sphere of fixed radius in three dimensions. Beginning at the north pole of a sphere in three-dimensional space, we specify the point at the north pole to be the identity rotation (a zero angle rotation). Just as in the case of the identity rotation, no axis of rotation is defined, and the angle of rotation (zero) is irrelevant. A rotation having a very small rotation angle can be specified by a slice through the sphere parallel to the xy plane and very near the north pole. The circle defined by this slice will be very small, corresponding to the small angle of the rotation. As the rotation angles become larger, the slice moves in the negative z direction, and the circles become larger until the equator of the sphere is reached, which will correspond to a rotation angle of 180 degrees. Continuing southward, the radii of the circles now become smaller (corresponding to the absolute value of the angle of the rotation considered as a negative number). Finally, as the south pole is reached, the circles shrink once more to the identity rotation, which is also specified as the point at the south pole.

Notice that a number of characteristics of such rotations and their representations can be seen by this visualization. The space of rotations is continuous, each rotation has a neighborhood of rotations which are nearly the same, and this neighborhood becomes flat as the neighborhood shrinks. Also, each rotation is actually represented by two antipodal points on the sphere, which are at opposite ends of a line through the center of the sphere. This reflects the fact that each rotation can be represented as a rotation about some axis, or, equivalently, as a negative rotation about an axis pointing in the opposite direction (a so-called double cover). The "latitude" of a circle representing a particular rotation angle will be half of the angle represented by that rotation, since as the point is moved from the north to south pole, the latitude ranges from zero to 180 degrees, while the angle of rotation ranges from 0 to 360 degrees. (the "longitude" of a point then represents a particular axis of rotation.) Note however that this set of rotations is not closed under composition. Two successive rotations with axes in the xy plane will not necessarily give a rotation whose axis lies in the xy plane, and thus cannot be represented as a point on the sphere. This will not be the case with a general rotation in 3-space, in which rotations do form a closed set under composition.

This visualization can be extended to a general rotation in 3-dimensional space. The identity rotation is a point, and a small angle of rotation about some axis can be represented as a point on a sphere with a small radius. As the angle of rotation grows, the sphere grows, until the angle of rotation reaches 180 degrees, at which point the sphere begins to shrink, becoming a point as the angle approaches 360 degrees (or zero degrees from the negative direction). This set of expanding and contracting spheres represents a hypersphere in four dimensional space (a 3-sphere). Just as in the simpler example above, each rotation represented as a point on the hypersphere is matched by its antipodal point on that hypersphere. The "latitude" on the hypersphere will be half of the corresponding angle of rotation, and the neighborhood of any point will become "flatter" (i.e. be represented by a 3-D Euclidean space of points) as the neighborhood shrinks. This behavior is matched by the set of unit quaternions: A general quaternion represents a point in a four dimensional space, but constraining it to have unit magnitude yields a three-dimensional space equivalent to the surface of a hypersphere. The magnitude of the unit quaternion will be unity, corresponding to a hypersphere of unit radius. The vector part of a unit quaternion represents the radius of the 2-sphere corresponding to the axis of rotation, and its magnitude is the cosine of half the angle of rotation. Each rotation is represented by two unit quaternions of opposite sign, and, as in the space of rotations in three dimensions, the quaternion product of two unit quaternions will yield a unit quaternion. Also, the space of unit quaternions is "flat" in any infinitesimal neighborhood of a given unit quaternion.

Parameterizing the space of rotations
We can parameterize the surface of a sphere with two coordinates, such as latitude and longitude. But latitude and longitude are ill-behaved (degenerate) at the north and south poles, though the poles are not intrinsically different from any other points on the sphere. At the poles (latitudes +90° and −90°), the longitude becomes meaningless.

It can be shown that no two-parameter coordinate system can avoid such degeneracy. Points on the sphere satisfy the constraint , so we still have just two degrees of freedom though there are three coordinates. A point  on the sphere represents a rotation in the ordinary space around the horizontal axis directed by the vector  by an angle .

In the same way the hyperspherical space of 3D rotations can be parameterized by three angles (Euler angles), but any such parameterization is degenerate at some points on the hypersphere, leading to the problem of gimbal lock. The point  represents a rotation around the axis directed by the vector  by an angle

Explaining quaternions' properties with rotations

Non-commutativity 

The multiplication of quaternions is non-commutative. This fact explains how the  formula can work at all, having  by definition. Since the multiplication of unit quaternions corresponds to the composition of three-dimensional rotations, this property can be made intuitive by showing that three-dimensional rotations are not commutative in general.

Set two books next to each other. Rotate one of them 90 degrees clockwise around the z axis, then flip it 180 degrees around the x axis. Take the other book, flip it 180° around x axis first, and 90° clockwise around z later. The two books do not end up parallel. This shows that, in general, the composition of two different rotations around two distinct spatial axes will not commute.

Orientation 

The vector cross product, used to define the axis–angle representation, does confer an orientation ("handedness") to space: in a three-dimensional vector space, the three vectors in the equation  will always form a right-handed set (or a left-handed set, depending on how the cross product is defined), thus fixing an orientation in the vector space. Alternatively, the dependence on orientation is expressed in referring to such  that specifies a rotation as to axial vectors. In quaternionic formalism the choice of an orientation of the space corresponds to order of multiplication:  but . If one reverses the orientation, then the formula above becomes , i.e., a unit  is replaced with the conjugate quaternion – the same behaviour as of axial vectors.

Alternative conventions 

It is reported that the existence and continued usage of an alternative quaternion convention in the aerospace and, to a lesser extent, robotics community is incurring a significant and ongoing cost. This convention is also referred to as "JPL convention" for its use in some parts of NASA's Jet Propulsion Laboratory.

Under Shuster's convention, the formula for multiplying two quaternions is altered such that

The formula for rotating a vector by a quaternion is altered to be

To identify the changes under Shuster's convention, see that the sign before the cross product is flipped from plus to minus.

Finally, the formula for converting a quaternion to a rotation matrix is altered to be

which is exactly the transpose of the rotation matrix converted under the traditional convention.

Software applications by convention used 
The table below groups applications by their adherence to either quaternion convention:

While use of either convention does not impact the capability or correctness of applications thus created, the authors of  argued that the Shuster convention should be abandoned because it departs from the much older quaternion multiplication convention by Hamilton and may never be adopted by the mathematical or theoretical physics areas.

Comparison with other representations of rotations

Advantages of quaternions 

The representation of a rotation as a quaternion (4 numbers) is more compact than the representation as an orthogonal matrix (9 numbers).  Furthermore, for a given axis and angle, one can easily construct the corresponding quaternion, and conversely, for a given quaternion one can easily read off the axis and the angle.  Both of these are much harder with matrices or Euler angles.

In video games and other applications, one is often interested in "smooth rotations", meaning that the scene should slowly rotate and not in a single step.  This can be accomplished by choosing a curve such as the spherical linear interpolation in the quaternions, with one endpoint being the identity transformation 1 (or some other initial rotation) and the other being the intended final rotation.  This is more problematic with other representations of rotations.

When composing several rotations on a computer, rounding errors necessarily accumulate.  A quaternion that is slightly off still represents a rotation after being normalized: a matrix that is slightly off may not be orthogonal any more and is harder to convert back to a proper orthogonal matrix.

Quaternions also avoid a phenomenon called gimbal lock which can result when, for example in pitch/yaw/roll rotational systems, the pitch is rotated 90° up or down, so that yaw and roll then correspond to the same motion, and a degree of freedom of rotation is lost. In a gimbal-based aerospace inertial navigation system, for instance, this could have disastrous results if the aircraft is in a steep dive or ascent.

Conversion to and from the matrix representation

From a quaternion to an orthogonal matrix 

The orthogonal matrix corresponding to a rotation by the unit quaternion  (with ) when post-multiplying with a column vector is given by

The quaternion representation of this rotation is given by:

where  is the conjugate of the quaternion , given by 

Also, quaternion multiplication is defined as (assuming a and b are quaternions, like z above):

where the order a, b is important since the cross product of two vectors is not commutative.

A more efficient calculation in which the quaternion does not need to be unit normalized is given by

where the following intermediate quantities have been defined:

From an orthogonal matrix to a quaternion 
One must be careful when converting a rotation matrix to a quaternion, as several straightforward methods tend to be unstable when the trace (sum of the diagonal elements) of the rotation matrix is zero or very small. For a stable method of converting an orthogonal matrix to a quaternion, see the Rotation matrix#Quaternion.

Fitting quaternions 
The above section described how to recover a quaternion  from a 3 × 3 rotation matrix . Suppose, however, that we have some matrix  that is not a pure rotation—due to round-off errors, for example—and we wish to find the quaternion  that most accurately represents . In that case we construct a symmetric 4 × 4 matrix

and find the eigenvector  corresponding to the largest eigenvalue (that value will be 1 if and only if  is a pure rotation). The quaternion so obtained will correspond to the rotation closest to the original matrix   .

Performance comparisons 
This section discusses the performance implications of using quaternions versus other methods (axis/angle or rotation matrices) to perform rotations in 3D.

Results 

Only three of the quaternion components are independent, as a rotation is represented by a unit quaternion.  For further calculation one usually needs all four elements, so all calculations would suffer additional expense from recovering the fourth component.  Likewise, angle–axis can be stored in a three-component vector by multiplying the unit direction by the angle (or a function thereof), but this comes at additional computational cost when using it for calculations.

* Quaternions can be implicitly converted to a rotation-like matrix (12 multiplications and 12 additions/subtractions), which levels the following vectors rotating cost with the rotation matrix method.

Used methods 

There are three basic approaches to rotating a vector :
 Compute the matrix product of a 3 × 3 rotation matrix  and the original 3 × 1 column matrix representing . This requires 3 × (3 multiplications + 2 additions) = 9 multiplications and 6 additions, the most efficient method for rotating a vector.
 A rotation can be represented by a unit-length quaternion  with scalar (real) part  and vector (imaginary) part . The rotation can be applied to a 3D vector  via the formula . This requires only 15 multiplications and 15 additions to evaluate (or 18 multiplications and 12 additions if the factor of 2 is done via multiplication.) This formula, originally thought to be used with axis/angle notation (Rodrigues' formula), can also be applied to quaternion notation. This yields the same result as the less efficient but more compact formula of quaternion multiplication .
 Use the angle/axis formula to convert an angle/axis to a rotation matrix  then multiplying with a vector, or, similarly, use a formula to convert quaternion notation to a rotation matrix, then multiplying with a vector. Converting the angle/axis to  costs 12 multiplications, 2 function calls (sin, cos), and 10 additions/subtractions; from item 1, rotating using  adds an additional 9 multiplications and 6 additions for a total of 21 multiplications, 16 add/subtractions, and 2 function calls (sin, cos). Converting a quaternion to  costs 12 multiplications and 12 additions/subtractions; from item 1, rotating using  adds an additional 9 multiplications and 6 additions for a total of 21 multiplications and 18 additions/subtractions.

Pairs of unit quaternions as rotations in 4D space 

A pair of unit quaternions  and  can represent any rotation in 4D space. Given a four-dimensional vector , and assuming that it is a quaternion, we can rotate the vector  like this:

The pair of matrices represents a rotation of ℝ4. Note that since , the two matrices must commute. Therefore, there are two commuting subgroups of the group of four dimensional rotations. Arbitrary four-dimensional rotations have 6 degrees of freedom; each matrix represents 3 of those 6 degrees of freedom.

Since the generators of the four-dimensional rotations can be represented by pairs of quaternions (as follows), all four-dimensional rotations can also be represented.

See also 

Anti-twister mechanism
Binary polyhedral group
Biquaternion
Charts on SO(3)
Clifford algebras
Conversion between quaternions and Euler angles
Covering space
Dual quaternion
Dual-complex number
Elliptic geometry
Rotation formalisms in three dimensions
Rotation (mathematics)
Spin group
Slerp, spherical linear interpolation
Olinde Rodrigues
William Rowan Hamilton

References

Further reading

External links and resources 
 
  on Rosetta Code
 
 
 
 
 
 
 

Quaternions
Rotation in three dimensions
Rigid bodies mechanics
3D computer graphics